Christopher Edwin Niosi (born December 31, 1988), also known by his pseudonym Kirbopher, is an American voice actor, animator, and producer.

His voice-work includes Lord Uroko in Nagi-Asu: A Lull in the Sea, Arataka Reigen in Mob Psycho 100, Dezel in Tales of Zestiria, Tiara in Queen's Blade Rebellion, Tetsuya Kinomoto in Dr. Stone, Khoury and others in the Pokémon series, Ernesto and others in OK K.O.! Let's Be Heroes, Pegasus in the Viz Media dub of Sailor Moon, Haruo Sakaki in Godzilla: Planet of the Monsters, Godzilla: City on the Edge of Battle, and Godzilla: The Planet Eater, and Therion and Mattias in Octopath Traveler.

Early life 
Niosi was born in Northport, New York and raised in Long Island. He attended the School of Visual Arts in New York City.

Career

Animation 
Niosi began making numerous animations for Newgrounds under the name "Kirbopher" in 2004, mostly making Nintendo-based parodies. His first professional animation job was for Eduware providing character design, animation and voices. He has also worked as an animator for the video games A Hat in Time, Skullgirls and Cryamore.

Terrain of Magical Expertise 
Niosi is the creator of the project Terrain of Magical Expertise, also known as TOME. The web series is known for its inclusion of several YouTube personalities and veteran Voice Actors such as Yuri Lowenthal, Jon St. John and Kyle Hebert. The series' concept was based on Niosi's experiences and interactions on internet forums in the early 2000's. The series' second season was eventually crowdfunded through GoFundMe to produce the remaining five episodes. The majority of the animation services were provided by Niosi himself, along with several guest animators and production assistants. TOME was first released on Newgrounds on November 11, 2011, and ran for sixteen episodes and nine shorts. The final episode released on July 7, 2015, while the final short released on November 11, 2016. In 2023, Niosi would later release a special edition version of the web series in the form of three compilations he titled the TOME: A2Z Compilation Movie Trilogy.

On September 30, 2017, a Kickstarter for a video game adaption was launched. The game features a customizable avatar known as the White Hat Hacker joining the established characters. The campaign was fully funded on November 4, 2017, successfully raising $111,162.63. The game was produced by Niosi's company NEO-C Productions LLC., with Niosi serving as the director, lead designer and character animator of the game, and was published by 1C Company, released on September 9, 2021, on Steam.

Voice Acting 
Niosi started doing voice acting on amateur productions on Newgrounds, but in 2009, he eventually booked his first professional gig as "Khoury" in five episodes of Pokémon: Diamond and Pearl: Galactic Battles. In 2014, he began voicing anime characters such as Yujiro Hattori in Bakuman, Taira in Queen's Blade Rebellion, and video game characters such as Dezel in Tales of Zestiria (which he later reprised in Tales of Zestiria the X). In 2016, Niosi voiced Arataka Reigen from Mob Psycho 100. In 2017, he was announced as the voice of Pegasus for the Viz Media dub of Sailor Moon SuperS.

In 2016, Niosi became a series regular in Cartoon Network's OK K.O.! Let's Be Heroes, which started airing on August 1, 2017; he voiced characters such as Nick Army, Neil, Pird and Ernesto. These roles eventually lead Niosi to join SAG-AFTRA and to be represented by Arlene Thornton & Associates. In 2018, Niosi was cast as Therion and Mattias in Octopath Traveler. In 2022, he went on to voice multiple characters in Monster Hunter Rise and River City Girls 2.

Controversy 
On July 18, 2019, Niosi made a post on his Tumblr and Twitter account confessing that he had been "emotionally abusing" his colleagues, family and partners for over a decade. Niosi's post highlighted specific instances of abuse for which he issued public apologies, in response to a callout post by one of his former partners, which was later. As a result, Niosi was recast from several projects in which he voiced major characters, including Fire Emblem: Three Houses, Mr. Osomatsu and Boruto: Naruto Next Generations. Later that year, Niosi attended an anger management group in Los Angeles and several emotionally focused therapy programs, in an effort to improve his past behavior. During this same time, the controversy surrounding Niosi grew into false criminal allegations of sexual and physical assault, withholding pay from commissioned animators and breaking non-disclosure agreements for projects he was previously involved in. On November 19, 2020, Niosi issued an official statement on his Twitter account to share details of his rehabilitation and debunk the false allegations, which was supported by several of his colleagues. He continued to work in voiceover and animation, later reprising his role as Julius Euclius in Isekai Quartet and Arataka Reigen in the third season of Mob Psycho 100.

Personal life 
Niosi has one half-brother and two half-sisters; one of them is former on-camera actress Alison Fanelli. Niosi was also diagnosed with Asperger syndrome. He moved to Los Angeles, California in 2014 to pursue a career in the animation industry.

Filmography

Animation

Anime

Film dubbing

Video games

Notes

References

External links 
  
 
 

1988 births
Living people
American people of Italian descent
Animators from New York (state)
American male video game actors
American male voice actors
Internet-related controversies
Male actors from Los Angeles
Sexual harassment in the United States
School of Visual Arts alumni
People from Long Island
People with Asperger syndrome